Cyrill Akono (born 29 February 2000) is a German professional footballer who plays as a forward for  club Borussia Dortmund II.

Club career

Mainz 05
On 20 May 2019, Bundesliga club 1. FSV Mainz 05 announced that they had signed Akono from 3. Liga side SC Preußen Münster for the upcoming 2019–20 season.

Lübeck
He joined 3. Liga club VfB Lübeck on loan until the end of the season in January 2021.

Verl
In May 2021, it was announced that Akono would join SC Verl on a three-year contract for the 2021–22 season.

Borussia Dortmund II
In December 2022, it was announced that Akono would join Borussia Dortmund II on a one-year and half contract for the 2022–23 and 2023–24 season.

Career statistics

Club

References

External links

2000 births
Living people
Sportspeople from Münster
Footballers from North Rhine-Westphalia
German footballers
Cameroonian footballers
German people of Cameroonian descent
Association football forwards
SC Preußen Münster players
1. FSV Mainz 05 players
1. FSV Mainz 05 II players
VfB Lübeck players
SC Verl players
Borussia Dortmund II players
3. Liga players
Regionalliga players